Hon. William Borthwick (14 June 1879 – 16 December 1956) was a British Liberal Party politician, Army Captain and Barrister.

Background
He was the son of Sir Thomas Borthwick, 1st Baronet and Letitia Mary Banks. He was a younger brother of Lord Whitburgh. In 1909 he married Ruth Margery Rigby of Putney, the only daughter of Jason Rigby. They had four children, including a son William Jason Maxwell Borthwick. She died in 1971. In 1913 he was granted the rank of a baron's son.

Career
He gained the rank of Temporary Captain in the service of the King's Royal Rifle Corps. He fought in the First World War between 1914 and 1918, where he was wounded twice and became a Prisoner of war.
In 1919 he was called to the Bar. At parliamentary elections he contested, as a Liberal party candidate North Dorset four times;

He did not stand for parliament again.

References

1879 births
1956 deaths
Liberal Party (UK) parliamentary candidates
Elworthy family